Martyn Rice is a Scottish international lawn bowler.

Bowls career
Rice won the fours gold medal and triples silver medal at the 2011 Atlantic Bowls Championships.

He became a Scottish national champion in 2017 after winning the singles at the Scottish National Bowls Championships.

References

Living people
Scottish male bowls players
Year of birth missing (living people)